Prairie fox may refer to:

Kit fox
Swift fox

Animal common name disambiguation pages